In 1973, the Indiana High School Athletic Association (IHSAA) established a three class state playoff system in football. In 1983, the tournament split into four classes, in 1985 into a five class system, and in 2013 into a six class system, with 6A for big schools and 1A for the smallest schools. This page represents all smaller school class tournament champions.

Indiana Class 6A State Football Champions 
For all large school football champions since 1920 see Indiana Big School Football Champions.

Indiana Class 5A State Football Champions 
2013 – Indianapolis Cathedral (11) 
2014 – Indianapolis Cathedral (12)
2015 – Fort Wayne Snider (2)*
2016 – Westfield
2017 – Columbus East (3)*
2018 – New Palestine (2)
2019 – New Palestine (3)
2020 – Indianapolis Cathedral (13)
2021 – Indianapolis Cathedral (14)
2022 - Valparaiso

For 1985–2012 see Indiana Big School Football Champions. Some multiple champion listings occur across classes. *Fort Wayne Snider won a big school title in 1992.  Columbus East won a big school title in 1979

Indiana Class 4A State Football Champions 
1985 - Brownsburg (2)
1986 - DeKalb
1987 - Hobart
1988 - Goshen (2)
1989 - Hobart (2)
1990 - Franklin Central 
1991 - Hobart (3)
1992 - Harrison (West Lafayette)
1993 - Hobart (4)
1994 - East Central
1995 - Fort Wayne Wayne
1996 - Indianapolis Cathedral (3)
1997 - Griffith
1998 - Indianapolis Cathedral (4)
1999 - Indianapolis Cathedral (5)
2000 - East Noble
2001 - Jasper 
2002 - Indianapolis Roncalli (6)
2003 - Indianapolis Roncalli (7)
2004 - Indianapolis Roncalli (8)
2005 - Lowell
2006 - Indianapolis Cathedral (6)
2007 - Evansville Reitz (6)*
2008 - Indianapolis Cathedral (7)
2009 - Evansville Reitz (7)*
2010 - Indianapolis Cathedral (8) 
2011 - Indianapolis Cathedral (9) 
2012 - Indianapolis Cathedral (10) 
2013 - Columbus East (2)* 
2014 - New Palestine 
2015 - Fort Wayne Bishop Dwenger (4)
2016 - Indianapolis Roncalli (9)
2017 - East Central (2)
2018 - Fort Wayne Bishop Dwenger (5)
2019 - Evansville Memorial
2020 - Indianapolis Roncalli (10)
2021 - Mt. Vernon
2022 - East Central (3)

For 1983-84 see Indiana Big School Football Champions. Some multiple champion listings occur across classes. *Evansville Reitz won big school state championships in 1948, '57, '60, '61, and '71.  Columbus East won a big school title in 1979

Indiana Class 3A State Football Champions 
1983 - Fort Wayne Bishop Dwenger 
1984 - Brownsburg
1985 - Indianapolis Roncalli 
1986 - Indianapolis Cathedral 
1987 - Zionsville
1988 - Indianapolis Roncalli (2)
1989 - Hammond Bishop Noll (2)*
1990 - Fort Wayne Bishop Dwenger (2)
1991 - Fort Wayne Bishop Dwenger (3)
1992 - Indianapolis Cathedral]] (2)
1993 - Indianapolis Roncalli (3)
1994 - Indianapolis Roncalli (4)
1995 - South Bend St. Joseph's (2)* 
1996 - Zionsville (2)
1997 - Indianapolis Bishop Chatard (3)
1998 - Indianapolis Bishop Chatard (4)
1999 - Indianapolis Roncalli (5)
2000 - Heritage Hills
2001 - Indianapolis Bishop Chatard (5)
2002 - Indianapolis Bishop Chatard (6)
2003 - Indianapolis Bishop Chatard (7)
2004 - Merrilville Andrean
2005 - NorthWood
2006 - Indianapolis Bishop Chatard (8) 
2007 - Indianapolis Bishop Chatard (9) 
2008 - Bellmont 
2009 - West Lafayette (2) 
2010 - Indianapolis Bishop Chatard (10)
2011 - Indianapolis Bishop Chatard (11)
2012 - Indianapolis Bishop Chatard (12) 
2013 - Merrilville Andrean (2)
2014 - Tri-West (4) 
2015 - Indianapolis Bishop Chatard (13) 
2016 - Fort Wayne Concordia 
2017 - Evansville Memorial 
2018 - West Lafayette (3)
2019 - Indianapolis Bishop Chatard (14) 
2020 - Indianapolis Bishop Chatard (15)
2021 - Gibson Southern
2022 - Indianapolis Bishop Chatard (16)

For 1973-82 see Indiana Big School Football Champions. Some multiple champion listings occur across classifications. *South Bend St. Joseph won a big school state championship in 1964, Hammond Bishop Noll in 1951.

Indiana Class 2A State Football Champions 
1973 - Greenfield-Central
1974 - Blackford
1975 - Mishawaka Marian (2)
1976 - Mishawaka Marian (3)
1977 - Plymouth
1978 - Goshen
1979 - Blackford (2)
1980 - Franklin Central
1981 - Franklin Central (2)
1982 - Franklin Central (3)
1983 - Indianapolis Chatard
1984 - Indianapolis Chatard (2)
1985 - Fort Wayne Luers
1986 - Whitko
1987 - Rochester
1988 - Western Boone
1989 - Fort Wayne Luers (2)
1990 - Indianapolis Scecina 
1991 - Indianapolis Scecina (2)
1992 - Fort Wayne Luers (3)
1993 - West Lafayette
1994 - Bremen (2)
1995 - North Montgomery
1996 - North Montgomery (2)
1997 - Jimtown (2)
1998 - Jimtown (3)
1999 - Fort Wayne Luers (4)
2000 - Evansville Mater Dei
2001 - Fort Wayne Luers (5)
2002 - Fort Wayne Luers (6)
2003 - Tri-West (2)
2004 - Tri-West (3)
2005 - Jimtown (4)
2006 - Fort Wayne Harding
2007 - Fort Wayne Luers (7)
2008 - Heritage Christian
2009 - Fort Wayne Luers (8)
2010 - Fort Wayne Luers (9)
2011 - Fort Wayne Luers (10)
2012 - Fort Wayne Luers (11) 
2013 - Indianapolis Ritter (4)
2014 - Rensselaer Central 
2015 - Monrovia 
2016 - Indianapolis Ritter (5)
2017 - Southridge
2018 - Western Boone (2)
2019 - Western Boone (3)
2020 - Western Boone (4)
2021 - Merrilville Andrean (3)
2022 - Evansville Mater Dei (2)

Some multiple champion listings occur across classifications.

Indiana Class 1A State Football Champions 
1973 - Mishawaka Marian
1974 - Garrett 
1975 - Lawrenceburg
1976 - Lafayette Central Catholic 
1977 - Indianapolis Ritter
1978 - Lawrenceburg (2)
1979 - Tippecanoe Valley 
1980 - Sheridan 
1981 - Hamilton Southeastern
1982 - Oak Hill 
1983 - Fountain Central
1984 - Sheridan (2) 
1985 - Eastern Hancock
1986 - South Putnam 
1987 - Sheridan (3)
1988 - Sheridan (4) 
1989 - Bremen
1990 - South Decatur
1991 - Jimtown 
1992 - Sheridan (5)
1993 - North Miami 
1994 - North White 
1995 - (Flora) Carroll 
1996 - Tri-West
1997 - Pioneer
1998 - Sheridan (6)
1999 - Lafayette Central Catholic (2)
2000 - Adams Central
2001 - Southern Wells
2002 - Southwood
2003 - Indianapolis Ritter (2) 
2004 - Seeger 
2005 - Sheridan (7)
2006 - Sheridan (8)
2007 - Sheridan (9)
2008 - Indianapolis Ritter (3)
2009 - Lafayette Central Catholic (3)
2010 - Lafayette Central Catholic (4)
2011 - Lafayette Central Catholic (5)
2012 - Lafayette Central Catholic (6) 
2013 - Tri-Central 
2014 - North Vermillion
2015 - Lafayette Central Catholic (7) 
2016 - Linton-Stockton 
2017 - Pioneer (2)
2018 - Pioneer (3)
2019 - Lafayette Central Catholic (8)
2020 - Indianapolis Covenant Christian
2021 - Indianapolis Lutheran
2022 - Indianapolis Lutheran (2)

Some multiple champion listings occur across classifications.

References

High school football in Indiana